The 2004 Canada Masters and the Rogers AT&T Cup were tennis tournaments played on outdoor hard courts. It was the 115th edition of the Canada Masters, and was part of the ATP Masters Series of the 2004 ATP Tour, and of the Tier I Series of the 2004 WTA Tour. The men's event took place at the Rexall Centre in Toronto, Ontario, Canada, from July 26 through August 1, 2004, and the women's event at the Uniprix Stadium in Montreal, Quebec, Canada, from August 2 through August 8, 2004.

The men's draw was headlined by World No. 1, Australian Open and Wimbledon champion Roger Federer, Wimbledon finalist and recent Indianapolis titlist Andy Roddick, and French Open runner-up and Monte Carlo winner Guillermo Coria. Other top seeds were 2004 Rome Masters champion Carlos Moyá, Indian Wells runner-up Tim Henman, David Nalbandian, Juan Carlos Ferrero and Rainer Schüttler.

The women's field was led by WTA No. 2, Rome and Berlin winner Amélie Mauresmo, Roland-Garros champion Anastasia Myskina, and French Open runner-up Elena Dementieva. Among other top players present were former World No. 1 Jennifer Capriati, seventeen-year-old Wimbledon champion Maria Sharapova, Ai Sugiyama, Nadia Petrova and Paola Suárez.

Finals

Men's singles

 Roger Federer defeated  Andy Roddick, 7–5, 6–3
It was Roger Federer's 8th title of the year, and his 19th overall. It was his 3rd Masters title of the year, and his 4th overall.

Women's singles

 Amélie Mauresmo defeated  Elena Likhovtseva, 6–1, 6–0
It was Amélie Mauresmo's 3rd title of the year, and her 13th overall. It was her 3rd Tier I title of the year, her 5th overall, and her 2nd win at the event.

Men's doubles

 Mahesh Bhupathi /  Leander Paes defeated  Jonas Björkman /  Max Mirnyi, 6–4, 6–2

Women's doubles

 Shinobu Asagoe /  Ai Sugiyama defeated  Liezel Huber /  Tamarine Tanasugarn, 6–0, 6–3

References

External links
Official website
Men's Singles draw
Men's Doubles draw
Men's Qualifying Singles draw
Women's Singles, Doubles, Qualifying Singles and Qualifying Doubles draws

 
Canada Masters
Rogers ATandT Cup
Canadian Open (tennis)
Canada Masters and the Rogers ATandT Cup
2004 in Canadian tennis
2004 in Ontario
2004 in Quebec